Marian "Lady Tyger" Trimiar (born August 15, 1953) is an American former professional boxer who competed between 1976 and 1985. Considered a pioneer in women's boxing, she became one of the first women to be granted a professional boxing license from the New York State Athletic Commission.

Trimiar began boxing training at 18 years old, after graduating from Julia Richman High School in Manhattan, New York. She fought in exhibition matches before it became legal for women to fight in sanctioned bouts. She was one of the first women to apply for a boxing license in New York State. In 1978, after a long lawsuit, Trimiar, Jackie Tonawanda, and Cathy "Cat" Davis were the first women to be issued a boxing license.

In 1979, Trimiar won the women's world lightweight championship versus opponent Sue "KO" Carlson in San Antonio, Texas. In 1987, she started a month-long hunger strike to advocate for increased pay and better working conditions for professional female boxers. She was a vocal supporter of making the sport more accessible to women. In 2021, Trimiar was inducted into the International Boxing Hall of Fame.

Professional boxing record

References

External links 
 

1953 births
World boxing champions
Living people
American women boxers
Boxers from New York City
Sportspeople from the Bronx
Lightweight boxers
World lightweight boxing champions
Julia Richman Education Complex alumni
International Boxing Hall of Fame inductees
21st-century American women